Evrytania (Latin: Eurytania) is one of the regional units of Greece. It is part of the region of Central Greece. Its capital is Karpenisi (approx. 8,000 inhabitants).

Geography

Evrytania is almost entirely formed of mountains, including the Tymfristos and the Panaitoliko in the south. Its rivers include the Acheloos in the west, Agrafiotis to the east, and Megdova in the east flowing down to the Ionian Sea.  It is one of the least populated regional units in Greece. The area borders Aetolia-Acarnania to the west, southwest and south (west over the Acheloos river), Karditsa regional unit to the north, and Phthiotis to the east. Evrytania also features a famous skiing resort located near Karpenisi on the Tymfristos mountain.

Climate
Its climate is a mixture of Mediterranean and mountainous in the western portion. Much of the area receives snow in winter and is warm during the summer months.

Transport

The Greek National Road 38 from Agrinio to Lamia passes through the southern part of Evrytania and the town Karpenisi. On the border with Phthiotis, the GR-38 passes through the 1.4 km-long Tymfristos Tunnel since 2004.

History
Evrytania dates to ancient times, the area was first settled around 6000 to 5000 BC. In classical antiquity, the Greek Eurytanes resided in the region.  In the 2nd century BC it fell into Roman hands, and became part of the Roman province of Macedonia. At the division of the Roman Empire in the 3rd century it joined the eastern part, which became the Byzantine Empire. In the aftermath of the Fourth Crusade in 1204 it became part of the Despotate of Epirus, which was conquered by the Ottoman Empire around 1450. Unlike other parts of Greece at the time, while the eastern and the southern parts were definitively ruled by the Ottomans, the area around Agrafa managed to sustain complete autonomy due to the difficulties experienced in conquest of the region.  After 400 years, Evrytania finally became part of Greece following the Greek War of Independence.  As in all of Greece, the area was affected by World War II, and later the Greek Civil War. Peace finally returned to Evrytania at the end of the 1940s and its economy expanded, though there was significant migration from the villages to cities.

Administration

The regional unit Evrytania is subdivided into 2 municipalities. These are (number as in the map in the infobox):
Agrafa (2)
Karpenisi (1)

Prefecture

Evrytania was created as a prefecture in 1947 out of the Aetolia-Acarnania prefecture. As a part of the 2011 Kallikratis government reform, the regional unit Evrytania was created out of the former prefecture Evrytania. The prefecture had the same territory as the present regional unit. At the same time, the municipalities were reorganised, according to the table below.

Persons
Pavlos Bakoyannis (1935-1989), Liberal Greek politician
Markos Giolias, artist
Demosthenis Goulas, artist
Stefanos Granitsas (1880-1915), artist, writer and journalist
Georgios Kafantaris (1873-1946), politician
Spyros Paliouras (1875-1957), a Greek artist and writer
Zacharias Papantoniou (1877-1940), artist, writer and journalist
Michael Stafylas (1920-2018), artist
Lefteris Theodorou, painter
Spyridon Papadimitriou, General Greek Army,

Bibliography
Evrytania and the History of Agios Nikolaos
Evrytanes Istories (Evrytanian Tales)

See also
List of settlements in Evrytania
Evrytania (constituency)

References

External links
Prefecture of Evrytania Official Website: www.evrytania.gr
Evrytania

 
Prefectures of Greece
1899 establishments in Greece
Regional units of Central Greece